Aidha is a non-governmental organisation in Singapore. It provides financial literacy and self-development training programmes for foreign domestic workers and lower-income women, and empower them to transform their lives through sustainable wealth creation.

History 

Aidha is a Sanskrit word which means "That to which we aspire".

Training programmes 
The following courses are provided to help domestic workers develop savings habits and skills needed to start a sustainable business for their families.

 Financial literacy course (such as Money management)
 Computer literacy course
 Leadership course
 Entrepreneurial skills course

References

External links 
 

Non-profit organisations based in Singapore
Organizations established in 2006